Meşəli may refer to:

Meşəli, Goranboy, Azerbaijan
Meşəli, Khachmaz, Azerbaijan
Meşəli, Khojali, Azerbaijan
Meşeli, Elâzığ